The 1945 Washington State Cougars football team was an American football team that represented Washington State College in the Pacific Coast Conference (PCC) during the 1945 college football season. First-year head coach Phil Sarboe led the team to a 6–2–1 mark in the PCC and 6–2–1 overall.  The season marked the resumption of play after the conclusion of World War II; the Cougars last fielded a team in 1942.

All of the games this season were within the conference. Montana was not on the schedule and the other four opponents from the northern division of the PCC were each played twice.

Schedule

References

External links
 Game program: Oregon State at WSC – October 6, 1945
 Game program: Idaho at WSC – October 27, 1945
 Game program: Oregon at WSC – November 10, 1945
 Game program: Washington at WSC – November 24, 1945

Washington State
Washington State Cougars football seasons
Washington State Cougars football